Logie Glacier is a tributary glacier, about  long and  wide, flowing west through the Cumulus Hills of Antarctica to enter Shackleton Glacier just northeast of Vickers Nunatak. It was named by the Southern Party of the New Zealand Geological Survey Antarctic Expedition (1961–62) for W.R. Logie, a New Zealand maintenance officer and field mechanic who spent nearly two years in the Antarctic and was Deputy-Leader of Scott Base during the 1962–63 season.

References

Glaciers of Dufek Coast